Stannum is the Latin word for tin and the source of its chemical symbol Sn.

Stannum may also refer to:
Stannum, New South Wales, small tin mining village
Fusinus stannum, a species of sea snail